|}

This is a list of electoral district results of the 1974 Western Australian election.

Results by Electoral district

Albany

Ascot

Avon

Balga

Boulder-Dundas

Bunbury

Canning

Clontarf

Cockburn

Collie

Cottesloe

Dale

East Melville

Floreat

Fremantle

Gascoyne

Geraldton

Greenough

Kalamunda

Kalgoorlie

Karrinyup

Katanning

Kimberley

Maylands

Melville

Merredin-Yilgarn

Moore

Morley

Mount Hawthorn

Mount Lawley

Mount Marshall

Mundaring

Murchison-Eyre

Murray

Narrogin 

Preferences were not distributed between the National Alliance and Liberal candidates for Narrogin.

Nedlands

Perth

Pilbara

Rockingham

Roe

Scarborough

South Perth

Stirling 

Preferences were not distributed between the National Alliance and Liberal candidates for Stirling.

Subiaco

Swan

Toodyay

Vasse

Victoria Park

Warren

Wellington

Welshpool

See also 

 1974 Western Australian state election
 Members of the Western Australian Legislative Assembly, 1974–1977
 Candidates of the 1974 Western Australian state election

References 

Results of Western Australian elections
1974 elections in Australia